HTH may refer to:

Transportation
 Handforth railway station, England, station code
 Hawthorne Industrial Airport, Nevada, US, IATA and FAA LID code
 Helitt Líneas Aéreas, a Spanish charter airline, ICAO code
 Heworth Interchange, Tyne and Wear Metro, England, station code

Science and technology
 Helix-turn-helix, a protein structural motif
 Homothorax, an arthropod gene

Other uses 
 Hand-to-hand combat
 High Tech High (disambiguation)
 Hope Through Health, an American charity
 House to House Heart to Heart, an American Christian magazine